Henry Ogilvie (born 2 November 1941) is a former Australian rules footballer who played with Carlton in the Victorian Football League (VFL).

Notes

External links 

Henry Ogilvie's playing statistics from The VFA Project
Henry Ogilvie's profile at Blueseum

1941 births
Carlton Football Club players
Ararat Football Club players
Werribee Football Club players
Australian rules footballers from Victoria (Australia)
Living people